Goombah is a pejorative slang term for people of Italian descent, mainly in the United States, with several related connotations to the Mafia (either the Italian-American Mafia, the original Sicilian Mafia, or other Italian organized crime groups) or gangs of Italian or Italian-American origin.

Etymology
Goombah and similar forms probably derived as an alteration or Anglicized spelling of the common Southern Italian familiar term of address, cumpà, the apocoped oxytone form of the word cumpari found in Southern Italian dialects and compare found in Standard Italian, which denotes the godfather in a baptism.

It is therefore commonly used as a term of endearment roughly equivalent to "friend," "brother," or "comrade" among close friends or associates (generally males) in certain parts of Southern Italy, including Campania and Sicily, where it becomes  cumpà or cumpari in the regional Southern languages. It has, however, also gained a less innocuous meaning even in Italy in certain criminal contexts, signifying an "accomplice," "cohort," "fellow criminal," or "partner-in-crime," though it is still mostly used among non-criminal Southern Italian males as a harmless address of affection.

Compare and the Southern Italian cumpà and cumpari ultimately derive from the medieval Latin compater, meaning "cousin" and, later, "godfather."

Social connotations 
With the arrival of Southern Italian immigrants in America, this appellation used among Southern Italian males, cumpà, became the Anglicized "goombah" or "gumba" to American ears. As the term cumpà was commonly heard as a term of address among Italian immigrants and Italian-Americans, the Anglicized version of cumpà, or "goombah," came to be used among non-Italians as a derogatory or patronizing way to refer to Italian-Americans. As with the more offensive slur, wop, Americans overheard Italian immigrants and Italian-Americans referring to each other as cumpà and began using the word as a condescending slur for people of Italian origins, often implying that the recipient of the slur is involved to some degree with criminality or has connections to the Mafia. 

Today, especially in Italian-American slang, "goombah" is a slang noun for a companion or associate, especially a friend who acts as a patron, accomplice, protector, or adviser. When used by non-Italians to refer to Italians or Italian-Americans, however, "goombah" is often derogatory in nature or deployed as an ethnic slur, implying a stereotypical Italian-American male, thug, or mafioso.
Also used as a term of endearment among men (who are friends) in Italian culture.

Examples 
In the 1950s, boxer/actor Rocky Graziano used the term in the original sense for NBC's The Martha Raye Show.

In the Chrysler Presents A Bob Hope Comedy Special NBC TV program (original air date September 27, 1963), singer Barbra Streisand introduces Italian-American singer Dean Martin as follows: "And now here's America's number one goombah, singing his new Reprise hit 'Via Veneto', il signore Deano Martin."

Derogatory use of the term is portrayed the 1969 publication of Mario Puzo's The Godfather and the highly popular movie made from it, which contained dialogue such as "I don't care how many guinea Mafia goombahs come out of the woodwork” or, in the film, “I don’t care how many dago guinea wop greaseball goombahs come outta the woodwork”.

In 2016, U.S. Senator Mark Kirk used the term in reference to what he regarded as unqualified political hires at a veterans' nursing home: "Blagojevich’s people ordered [Tammy Duckworth] to take on some political operatives and I would call them goombahs in the Anna Nursing home facility that she was in charge of", drawing bemused commentary for his "Sopranos throwback moment".

See also
 Anti-Italianism
Goomba
 Goomah
Guappo
Guido (slang)
Paesano
Sicilian Mafia
Wop

References

Pejorative terms for European people
Anti-Italian sentiment
Ethnic and racial stereotypes
Italian language in the United States
Italian-American culture
Italian-American history
English words
Pejorative terms for white people